Vinnie Caruana (born September 25, 1979) is an American singer. He is the vocalist for Long Island punk band The Movielife and lead singer/songwriter for the indie/post hardcore band I Am the Avalanche.

Music career

The Movielife 
The Movielife is a Long Island melodic hardcore band, composed of vocalist Vinnie Caruana, bassist Phil Navetta, guitarist Brandon Reilly, drummer Evan Baken, and guitarist Alex Amiruddin, until 2001 when Alex Amiruddin left and was replaced by Dan Navetta.  The band was active from 1997 to 2003 with brief reunion shows from 2010 to 2011. The Movielife released three EPs and two full-length albums before disbanding. At the 2008 Bamboozle, Caruana was joined by the members of Set Your Goals to perform a set of The Movielife songs.

In 2015, The Movielife played two reunion shows at Irvine Plaza to start a reunion tour.

I Am The Avalanche
I Am the Avalanche is a Brooklyn-based Post-Hardcore band which features Vinnie Caruana on vocals. I Am the Avalanche are a part of Cardboard City, a New York-based group of bands and artists led by Vin's best friend Daryl Palumbo (Glassjaw, Head Automatica, House of Blow) and DJ Krazyglue. I Am the Avalanche's first album was produced by Barett Jones (Foo Fighters, The Melvins).

Peace'd Out
Peace'd Out is a Los Angeles-based Hardcore band which features Vinnie Caruana on vocals, guitarist Steve Choi (RX Bandits), bassist Roger Camero (No Motiv), and drummer Casey Deitz (The Velvet Teen).  Choi began writing for this project in 2007.  The group released a five-song EP, Peace'd Out EP, in 2012. The song "Baadering Raam" is about the 1989 Hillsborough disaster.

Solo artist
Caruana routinely performs in New York City in a solo role having played numerous tours. Vinnie released his debut solo EP early 2013 through I Surrender / Run For Cover Records. Caruana will take part of the Acoustic Basement Tour which Thursday vocalist Geoff Rickly, A Loss For Words, and Koji.

In 2014 Caruana provided the song "It's Been Way Too Long" to the soundtrack of the Jason Michael Brescia film Bridge and Tunnel.

On December 7, 2015, Caruana announced that he had signed to Equal Vision Records and had started recording his next full-length album, to be released in 2016.Caruana released his solo album Aging Frontman on October 4, 2019.

Constant Elevation
Caruana is currently the lead vocalist for the hardcore band, Constant Elevation, which includes longtime New York Hardcore drummer, Sammy Siegler.

Personal life
Caruana married his wife Laura in 2017. He has many tattoos, including "IATA" (for his band, I Am The Avalanche) on his wrist and The Movielife's bumblebee logo on his arm. He also has Milo from the Everything Sucks' Descendents album on his leg. He is an avid fan of Liverpool F.C.

Guest appearances

References 

Living people
1979 births
Run for Cover Records artists
21st-century American singers
21st-century American male singers
Head Automatica members
The Movielife members
Equal Vision Records artists